The Kasekela chimpanzee community (formerly spelled Kasakela) is a habituated community of wild eastern chimpanzees that lives in Gombe National Park near Lake Tanganyika in Tanzania.  The community was the subject of Jane Goodall's pioneering study that began in 1960, and studies have continued ever since, becoming the longest continuous study of any animals in their natural habitat. As a result, the community has been instrumental in the study of chimpanzees and has been popularized in several books and documentaries. The community's popularity was enhanced by Goodall's practice of giving names to the chimpanzees she was observing, in contrast to the typical scientific practice of identifying the subjects by number. Goodall generally used a naming convention in which infants were given names starting with the same letter as their mother, allowing the recognition of matrilineal lines.

One of the most important discoveries that was learned by observing the Kasekela chimpanzee community was the use of tools. On November 4, 1960, Goodall observed a chimpanzee that she had named David Greybeard using a grass stalk as a tool to extract termites from a termite hill. Later, she observed David Greybeard and another chimpanzee named Goliath stripping leaves off twigs to create termite fishing tools. Previously, tool use in chimpanzees was only rarely observed, and tool creation by non-human animals had never been observed. Until then, tool making was considered one of the defining characteristics of being human.  Another important observation occurred a few days earlier, on October 30, 1960. On that day Goodall observed the community's chimpanzees eating meat, dispelling the notion that chimpanzees are vegetarians.  A third observation by Goodall in the early 1960s was that male chimpanzees perform a "rain dance," charging, calling, slapping the ground and trees and dragging branches in the rain. In the early 1970s the chimpanzees of the community were observed to engage in ongoing coordinated attacks against the chimpanzees of the neighbouring Kahama Chimpanzee Community, ultimately wiping it out. According to historian Ian Morris, this "Four Year War" represented the first time scientists had observed chimpanzees "deliberately seek out, attack and leave for dead" chimps from another community, and it has been described as "the first record of lasting 'warfare' among [non-human] primates."

Several families within the Kasekela chimpanzee community have been particularly prominent in books and documentaries. The F-family has produced five alpha males for the community, and the matriarch, Flo, played a particularly important role in acknowledging Goodall's acceptance as a human observer by the community. The G-family has produced at least one alpha male, and also the birth of several twins, which are rare among chimpanzees. There are other families as well which include the T-family and S-family (which has produced one alpha male).

F-family

Flo
Flo (c.1919 – 1972) was the matriarch of the F-family, so named because she and all her matrilineal descendants were given names beginning with the letter "F". In 1962, Flo was one of the first chimpanzees to approach Goodall's camp, along with her infant daughter Fifi. Video of Flo approaching Goodall and allowing Fifi to reach out to touch Goodall's forehead, letting Goodall know she had been accepted, is shown in the IMAX film Jane Goodall's Wild Chimpanzees. Later she brought her sons Figan and Faben, who would later become prominent members of the community to the camp, and when she came into estrus in 1963 she attracted the community's males to Goodall's camp.

Flo was a high-ranking female who had at least five known offspring, three sons (Faben, Figan and Flint) and two daughters (Fifi and Flame). Flo was 28 years old when she gave birth to Faben. Most female chimpanzees have their first infant when 12–14 years of age, so it is possible that Flo had at least one infant prior to Faben and that infant either died or, if it was a female, would have transferred to one of the other communities prior to Goodall's arrival to Gombe. When Flo died in 1972, she was given an obituary in Britain's Sunday Times.

Faben
Faben (c.1947 – 1975) was Flo's oldest son and oldest known offspring.  He was a powerful male, but lost the use of one arm in a polio epidemic that ravaged the community in 1966.  Despite his disability, he learned to create spectacular bipedal charging displays, which allowed him to regain a high rank within the community.  His support was critical to Humphrey's ascension to alpha male rank in 1969, and then his brother Figan's ascension to alpha male in 1972.  Faben also participated in the conflicts with the rival Kahama community (which was formed by former Kasekela members) that occurred between 1973 and 1975, and was a leader in the killing of several Kahama males, including former Kasekela alpha male Goliath.  Faben himself died in 1975, possibly as a result of the conflicts with the Kahama community.  Following Faben's death, Figan had difficulty maintaining his alpha male position for several months.

Figan
Figan (c.1953 – 1982) was Flo's second son.  Goodall considered him to be Gombe's most intelligent chimpanzee.  Although younger than Faben, he was able to dominate his older brother after Faben's arm was paralyzed from polio in 1966.  With Faben's support, Figan was able to become alpha male in 1972 by defeating the prior alpha Humphrey and an older competitor Evered.  After Faben's death in 1975, Figan lost his unquestioned alpha status, in that he could be dominated by a coalition of males, but remained the top-ranked male.  By 1977, he had regained his alpha status by forging alliances with other males, including his predecessor Humphrey.  In 1979, he was toppled from his alpha status by 15-year-old Goblin, whom he had previously supported, but regained his alpha status once again by forging alliances with other males.  Although a powerful male, Figan's ability to make alliances with other males was instrumental to allow him to hold on to his alpha status.  In 1982, Goblin unseated him again, and Figan disappeared and presumably died a few months later, although when last seen he appeared  to be in good health.  Although Figan was the alpha male for several years, he is not known for certain to have sired any infants, although he is likely the father of a few.

Fifi
Fifi (c.1958 – 2004) was Flo's oldest daughter.  Like her mother, she became a high-ranking female within the community.  Fifi had nine infants, seven of whom survived to independence.  Her two oldest sons, Freud and Frodo, both have become the community's alpha male, as did another son, Ferdinand. One of her other sons, Faustino, also attained high rank. Her three surviving daughters were Fanni, Flossi and Flirt.  She also had one son, Fred (1996–1997) and one daughter, Furaha (2002–2004) who died in infancy.  Fred was fathered by one of Fifi's other sons, Frodo.  Five-year-old Fifi was the focal point of the documentary People of the Forest: The Chimps of Gombe, in which her mother and siblings also featured, attempting to gain access to her infant brother Flint. All four of Fifi's surviving sons had all held the alpha and/or beta positions in the community.  Grandson Fudge (by Fanni) also attained alpha male status. Late in Frodo's reign as alpha male, Fifi helped defend him against attacks and she suffered some injuries in the process.

Flint
Flint (1964–1972) was Flo's third son, and her first infant born after Goodall began observing the community.  Goodall had intended that Flint become the first wild chimpanzee to have his life documented from birth to death.  Flint had difficulty weaning, and became distraught and angry when the birth of his sister Flame displaced him as Flo's baby.  After Flame disappeared, possibly by the hand
of Flint, he regained his enthusiasm, but resumed his needy, infantlike behavior. After his nephew Freud was born, Flint became fascinated with the new infant and became an important influence of Freud's first year of life. Following the death of his mother Flo in 1972, Flint became depressed and ill; he died about three weeks after her.

Flame
Flame (1968–1969) was Flo's daughter.  Flo's son Flint, at age four, threw violent fits in order to suckle his mother's breast while newborn Flame was in Flo's arms.  Flame disappeared shortly after she was born; there has been speculation she may have been killed by her jealous brother Flint.

Freud
Freud (May 1971 – March 2014) was Fifi's oldest son.  His father was a male from outside the Kasekela community.  As a juvenile, he benefited from a high-ranking mother and an uncle, Figan, who was the alpha male.    In 1993, Freud became the alpha male by unseating his childhood playmate Wilkie.  While the alpha male, his younger but larger brother Frodo became the second highest-ranking male in the community. In 1997, while Freud was afflicted by sarcoptic mange, Frodo was able to take over the alpha status.  After losing his alpha status, Freud settled into a role as a middle-ranking male, although could still threaten higher-ranking males when aroused.  He was also able to serve as an important ally to other males.

Although less aggressive than his brother Frodo, Freud is known to have engaged in at least one instance of infanticide, killing a Kasekela infant named Tofiki in 2004.  In his old age, his younger brothers sometimes provided him support, such as sharing meat and honey with him.  The documentary Chimpanzee Family Fortunes ends with a scene of the orphaned young female Flirt finding solace after several lonely months by getting groomed by her older brother Freud.  He fathered at least one infant, the female Cocoa to Candy, born in 2004 Freud's approach to maintaining his alpha status was different from his smaller predecessor Wilkie and his larger successor Frodo.  At , Freud was larger than the 81-pound (37-kilogram) Wilkie and smaller than the 113-pound (51-kilogram) Frodo.  Freud was less aggressive than and groomed other males to help maintain alliances more often than Frodo, but engaged in more contact aggression and less grooming than Wilkie. While alpha male he was able to intimidate even the larger Frodo with his displays.

Freud died in March 2014, at more than 42 years old, which made him the oldest male whose age was known in the history of the community.  Freud was one of the first wild chimpanzees whose entire life from birth to old age was documented by researchers.

Frodo
Frodo (June 30, 1976 – November 10, 2013) was Fifi's second-oldest son. His father was the relatively low-ranking male Sherry. Even from a young age, Frodo was unusually large and aggressive. He learned to throw rocks as a juvenile and became very accurate with his aim; he sometimes threw them at his human observers, often hitting and bruising them. He also became an excellent hunter of red colobus monkeys, and was also able to intimidate other chimpanzees into sharing their kills with him if he was unsuccessful. From 1990 to 1995, Frodo killed 10% of the red colobus monkeys within his home range. His large size and aggressive nature allowed him to attain high status in the group, while his brother Freud was alpha male. On October 2, 1997, while Freud and other community members were suffering from sarcoptic mange, Frodo attacked and defeated Freud, thus attaining the alpha male position. Researchers speculated that Frodo was unaffected by the mange because he interacted less with the other apes, giving the parasite less opportunity to infect him. After taking over the alpha male position, Frodo demonstrated his new power by protecting his vanquished brother from the other males; typically the former alpha is attacked by the other males and forced to leave the community for a period of time.

As alpha male, Frodo maintained his position largely through intimidation.  He rarely groomed other males, and often demanded that other males groom him.  Frodo remained alpha male until becoming ill himself in 2002; he was then defeated by a coalition of several males and spent most of the next two years alone, recovering from his wounds and illness.  He received antibiotics from the researchers, which likely helped his recovery.  In 2004, he once again began travelling with the rest of the community, but was unable to re-establish his alpha status.  In his later years, Frodo mellowed. He became less aggressive and spent much time by himself, although he could still intimidate other chimpanzees on occasion.  Frodo died in 2013.

Frodo's aggression was not limited to colobus monkeys and other chimpanzees. In May 2002, he killed a 14-month-old human child that the niece of a member of the research team had carried into his territory.  As a result, the Tanzanian National Parks Department considered killing Frodo.  In 1988, he attacked visiting Far Side cartoonist Gary Larson, leaving him bruised and scratched. Frodo had a history of attacking the researchers observing him; Goodall was attacked by Frodo on multiple occasions and, in 1989, the ape beat her head so violently her neck was nearly broken.

Frodo fathered at least eight infants, second only to group male Wilkie, who fathered ten.  Infants he fathered included:
 Zeus (1993– ), by Trezia.  Zeus was part of a coalition that helped topple his uncle Ferdinand from alpha male status.
 Titan (1994– ), a large, aggressive adolescent male by Patti
 Fred (1996–1997), by Fifi, Frodo's own mother
 Golden and Glitter (1998– ), female twins and the oldest chimpanzee twins known to have survived in the wild, by Gremlin
 Tarzan (1999– ), Titan's brother by Patti
 Samwise (2001– ), an aggressive female by Sandi
 Sinbad (2001– ), Sparrow's youngest son

Fanni
Fanni (b. March 19, 1981) is Fifi's oldest daughter.  Her father was Goblin.  She had her first infant, Fax, at just 11 years old, making her one of the youngest mothers seen in the community, although Fax did not survive to adulthood.  She has also had five other children, males Fudge (1996– ), Fundi (2000– ), Fifty (2010– ) and Ficma (2015–) and females Familia (2004– ) and Fadhila (2007– ).  Fudge, Fundi and Familia were fathered by Sheldon, who would later become alpha male.  Familia disappeared in 2012.  Fadhila was fathered by Wilkie, another former alpha male. Fifty was also sired by Wilkie.  As of 2021, Fudge is the alpha male of the community.

Flossi
Flossi (b. February 8, 1985) is Fifi's second-oldest daughter.  Her father was Goblin. Unlike most other female chimpanzees in the F-family, upon reaching adulthood she emigrated from the Kasekela community to join the neighbouring Mitumba Chimpanzee Community in 1996, although her younger sister Flirt (who was born after Flossi emigrated) later joined her. Although it is typical for female chimpanzees to emigrate from their natal group upon reaching maturity, within the Kasekela community only about half the females do so. Flossi may have chosen to emigrate to avoid mating attempts from her brother Frodo. Before emigrating from the Kasekela community, Flossi may have innovated the practice of fishing for ants to eat using a stick, which had not been observed before within the Kasekela community (although fishing for termites had been) but soon after the practice spread throughout the community. Flossi has given birth to four offspring, the males Forest (1997–  and Fansi (2001– ) and the females Flower (2005– ), and Falida (2009– ).  Flossi became a high ranking female within the Mitumba community; more typically immigrating females remain at a low rank.

Faustino
Faustino (b. May 8, 1989) is Fifi's third oldest son.  His father was brother Freud's rival Wilkie.  At the beginning of the documentary Chimps: So Like Us, the infant Faustino is shown with mother Fifi and sister Flossi trying out facial expressions.  Fifi became pregnant less than three years after Faustino was born, an unusually short time for a chimpanzee.  As a result, Faustino had to be weaned at an unusually young age, leading to a particularly difficult weaning conflict.  This may account for Faustino being more skittish as a juvenile than his younger brother.

Faustino grew into a large but mellow adult who reminded observers of Freud.  He had worked his way up to become the beta, or second highest-ranking, male in the community until struck by a near fatal disease in 2005. Although Faustino survived, he lost his high rank. After recovering, Faustino slowly climbed his way back up the hierarchy, but it appears he will never become alpha male.  However, he did help his younger brother Ferdinand attain alpha status in 2008, and continued to provide important support  for  Ferdinand in his brother's role as alpha, although as of early 2014 he would sometimes ally himself with Ferdinand's potential rival Titan.  He is the father of Gaia's son Google, born in 2010.

Ferdinand
Ferdinand (b. August 19, 1992) is Fifi's fourth oldest son.  His father was his uncle Figan's rival Evered, who was 41 years old when Ferdinand was conceived.  He became the first wild great ape to have his birth recorded.  By 2007, he had grown into a large enough male to wound the alpha male Kris, and researchers believed he would eventually become the third of Fifi's sons to become alpha male. In 2008, he succeeded in supplanting Kris as alpha male, after wounding Kris badly in a fight.  Ferdinand maintained his alpha male position primarily through intimidation and threats and even surprising attacking males.  He would bite rivals on the back to leave a scar.  By the last two years of his reign Ferdinand's aggressiveness had made him so unpopular with other group males that he spent most of his time apart from them, returning to assert his dominance every so often. During that time a coalition of rival males formed that included his nephews Fudge and Fundi and, their father and uncle Sheldon and Sampson, and another nephew Zeus.  In October 2016 the coalition attacked Ferdinand when he made one of his occasional appearances to try to assert his continuing dominance.  Fudge and Fundi led the attack, with some support from their mother (and Ferdinand's sister) Fanni.  Ferdinand was badly wounded in the attack and had to leave the group to recover.  In his absence, Fudge was able to assert his dominance and attain the alpha position.

Ferdinand has been successful in siring offspring. Infants he fathered included Diaz by Dilly fathered at very young age of 12 in 2005, Tabora (2006– ) by Tanga, and Gizmo (2010–2016) by Gremlin.

Flirt
Flirt (b. July 1998) is Fifi's youngest surviving daughter.  Her father was Kris, who would later become alpha male of the troop.  She was a large baby and grew rapidly.  This probably allowed her to survive when her mother died before she was seven years old.  Although she spent a few lonely months after Fifi's death, she would begin to travel with her brothers.  The documentary Chimpanzee Family Fortunes ends with Flirt finding solace after months of loneliness by being groomed by eldest brother Freud.  She followed in the footsteps of her sister Flossi in eventually emigrating to the Mitumba Chimpanzee Community in 2013.

Fudge
Fudge (b. 1996) is Fanni's oldest surviving son. His father is Sheldon, a former alpha male. He is the fifth male of the F-family to reach alpha male status, overthrowing his own maternal uncle Ferdinand in October 2016.  Fudge had joined a coalition that included his brother Fundi, his father Sheldon, his uncle Sampson and his cousin Zeus in opposition to Ferdinand.  In October 2016 Fudge led an attack by the rival males on Ferdinand.  Fundi was his primary supporter in the attack and they received some support from their mother Fanni, who is Ferdinand's sister.  After seriously wounding Ferdinand in the attack, Fudge was able to assert his dominance over the remaining group males to attain alpha male status.

Fundi
Fundi (b. 2000) is Fanni's second oldest surviving son.  His father is the former alpha male Sheldon; Fudge, the alpha male as of 2016, is his full brother.  In 2016 Fundi helped Fudge attack their uncle Ferdinand, the previous alpha male, which allowed Fudge to attain his alpha status.

G-family

Melissa
Melissa (c.1950–1986) was a high-ranking female and mother of long-term alpha male Goblin.  Researchers also suspected that she was related to alpha male Humphrey and another male, Mr McGregor.  She was afflicted by polio in the 1966 epidemic, and for a while was paralyzed in her neck and shoulders, and was forced to walk bipedally. She would regain use of her arms, although she never fully regained movement of her neck.  She gave birth to two sets of twins, one set in 1976 of which neither survived the year, and another set in 1977, of which only Gimble survived to adulthood.  Her other offspring who survived to adulthood was daughter Gremlin.  Her daughter Gremlin and her granddaughter Gaia have also given birth to twins.

Goblin
Goblin (September 1964 – August 2004) was Melissa's oldest son.  He was discovered by Goodall when he was just a few hours old, with a twisted face that led her to name him Goblin.  Goblin was protected by Figan as an adolescent, but at the young age of 15 in 1979 he challenged and defeated Figan to become the top-ranking male.  He was defeated and brutally beaten by a coalition of older males later in the year, giving up his top ranking.  Goblin regained the top-ranked position in 1982, and was the unambiguous alpha male, able to control even coalitions of rival males, by 1984.  Goblin maintained his alpha status until 1989, when he was badly beaten and injured by a coalition of males led by Wilkie.  He was sterilized by a bite to his testicles in the process.  He spent time away from the rest of the community recovering from his injuries, during which time Goodall administered medication to help him return to health.  He later became Freud's key ally in becoming and retaining his position as alpha male, apparently going so far as to encourage Freud to challenge Wilkie for the role.  While Freud was alpha Goblin was able to be a wedge between Freud and Frodo, who had previously been close companions, but when Frodo overtook Freud Goblin switched his allegence to Frodo.  Goblin died of disease in August 2004.

After recovering from his injuries, Goblin maintained a high-ranking status within the community by forming alliances with the alpha males, especially Freud and Frodo.  While he was establishing himself as a contender for the alpha position, he would occasionally beat up Goodall.  In 1983, when his mother Melissa was in estrus, he forced himself upon her despite her efforts to resist.  Fanni and Flossi, by Fifi, and Tanga (1989– ), by Patti, are his daughters.

Gremlin
Gremlin (b. 1970) is Melissa's only daughter to survive to adulthood.  Her father was Evered, who more than 20 years later fathered the alpha male Ferdinand.  Goodall has described her as her favourite chimpanzee due to her patience as a mother and her expertise in fishing for termites.  She has raised her twins, Golden and Glitter, to be the oldest wild twin chimpanzees known in the wild.  Her other offspring are the males Getty (1982–1986), Galahad (1988–2000), Gimli (2004– ),  Gizmo (2010–2016) and female Gaia (1993– ).  She gave birth to Grendel in 2015 and a son Goodali in 2019, at the age of almost 50.  She was severely attacked by Fifi and Fifi's daughter Fanni after giving birth to female infants (Gaia in 1993, Golden and Glitter in 1998) both times she did so during Fifi's lifetime.

Gimble
Gimble (b. October 1977) is one of two of Melissa's sons to survive to adulthood.  He was one of a set of twins; however, his twin brother Gyre died in 1978.  As a twin, he grew into a healthy but small adult.  He reached a relatively high rank in the late 1990s but fell to a low-ranking male by 2004.  He fathered at least two children, Mambo by Malaika, born in 2004, and Zinda by Trezia (2006 – October 2012).  He disappeared in early 2007.

Gaia
Gaia (b. February 1993) is Gremlin's oldest daughter.  Her father was Wilkie.  As a juvenile, she helped her mother raise the twins Glitter and Golden, and this is shown in a number of documentaries about the community.  Gremlin took Gaia's first-born son from her, and the son died in infancy.  Gaia's second infant was stillborn, but her third pregnancy resulted in twins.  However, once again her mother took over the babies, and one of the twins died at a few days old. She finally gave birth to a son named Google in 2010, fathered by Faustino.  She gave birth to a son named Gabo in 2015.

Glitter and Golden
Glitter and Golden (b. July 1998) are the twin daughters of Gremlin, fathered by Frodo.  They are the only pair of wild chimpanzee twins known to have survived to the age of sexual maturity.  Several documentaries have featured Gremlin raising the twins, with help of their sister Gaia.  Each of the pair exhibits a different personality. Glitter is shy and cautious, while Golden is more adventurous and willing to engage in rough and tumble activities.  In 2011, Glitter gave birth to daughter named Gossamer, fathered by Sheldon.  She gave birth to a son named Ghurubu in 2016.  In 2012, Golden gave birth to a daughter named Glamour.  Golden gave birth to a son named Gombe in 2017.

P-family

Passion
Passion (c.1951–1982) was a central female of the Kasekela community. She, along with her daughter Pom, captured, killed, and ate about ten newborns at Gombe. Passion possessed a rather domineering and aggressive personality; according to Goodall, Passion was an unnatural and indifferent mother to her three surviving offspring, but she became a very high-ranking female. She became more solitary later in life and died of some type of wasting disease in 1982. In addition to Pom, Prof and Pax, she gave birth to a baby in 1962 which died in infancy. She also had a stillborn baby, or possibly a miscarriage in 1970.

Pom
Pom (1965–1983) was Passion's oldest known offspring to survive to adulthood.  Pom was instrumental in helping her mother capture and kill community infants.  Pom gave birth herself to Pan in 1978, and was very cautious with the infant around her mother. Pan died of injuries from an accident in 1981. Pom eventually disappeared about a year after her mother's death. She may have transferred to another community, but she was never seen again.

Prof
Prof (October 27, 1971 – 198?) was a male that survived to adulthood.  He and Pom offered their little brother comfort following Passion's death.  Prof and Pax associated closely for a number of years.  Prof is deceased.

Pax
Pax (b. December 16, 1977) was Passion's last offspring.  He was only four years old when he was orphaned.  He had the support of an elder brother and sister, and had very few behavioral issues following his mother's death. When Pax was very young, his mother was wounded in some type of conflict.  Pax lost his testicles as a result of the conflict, which has affected his personality greatly.  He is small for a male, doesn't compete in the male hierarchy, and is unable to reproduce. He also has been chosen by a couple of orphans as a companion.

Pan
Pan (October 17, 1978 – 1981) was the only known offspring of Pom. He was injured after being blow from a palm tree by a strong wind and died four days later.

Patti
Patti (c.1961–2005) was not born in the Kasekela community but joined the community in 1973.  She was an assertive female who spent much time on her own.  Her first two infants died before reaching adulthood, but she has successfully raised several chimps since.  Besides Tapit, Tita, Tanga, Titan and Tarzan, she had two offspring who died in infancy, including her first born Pibi (1978) and a baby of unknown sex in 1988. She was killed by males from the rival Mitumba Chimpanzee Community in 2005.

T-family

Tapit
Tapit (1979–1983) was Patti's second-oldest son. He had a rough life and was sickly as an infant and died as a juvenile.

Tita
Tita (b. January 1984) is Patti's oldest daughter. She gave birth to her first infant, Tibi in 1995, but he died in infancy.  Another son Tofiki (fathered by Sheldon) was born in 2000 but was killed in 2004 when Freud attacked him while grooming Tita.

Tanga
Tanga (b. April 1989) is Patti's second oldest daughter.  Her father was Goblin.  She still lives in the community and gave birth to her first infant, Tom, in 2001.  In 2006, she gave birth to a daughter named Tabora. In October 2012, she gave birth to a daughter named Tarime who died in 2013. In 2014, she gave birth to Tukuyu, whose father is mostly likely Fudge.

Titan
Titan (b. August 1994) is Patti's third oldest son, fathered by Frodo. Titan displays aggressive behaviour resembling his father Frodo's violent tendencies. Like Frodo, as a youngster he would throw rocks at researchers.  Also like his father, Titan is large, and as of 2013 was the largest male in the community.  As of 2012, researchers believed that he may have been ready to challenge Ferdinand for alpha status, as he spent a lot of time near Ferdinand and sometimes helped Ferdinand maintain control.  However, over the following year, Titan slipped in rank.  Researchers suspect that he may be afraid to challenge for the alpha spot, and also that his reluctance to groom other chimps may inhibit him from forming the alliances needed to attain alpha status.  As of early 2014, Titan had occasionally been able to ally himself with Ferdinand's older brother Faustino in attempts to challenge Ferdinand, but he has not been able to maintain that alliance reliably, and at times Faustino would also join with Ferdinand to attack Titan.  Titan fathered a daughter, Baseke by Bahati in 2010.

Tarzan
Tarzan (b. October 1999) is Patti's fourth oldest son.  His father was Frodo, making him Titan's full brother.

Tom
Tom (b. March 2001) is Tanga's first son, fathered by Kris.

Tabora
Tabora (b. 2007) is Tanga's first daughter.  Her father is Ferdinand.

S-family

Sparrow
Sparrow (b. 1958) is the oldest female and matriarch of the family. She has had seven offspring which include four sons, Sheldon, Steve, Spud and Sinbad and three daughters, Sandi, Barbet and Schweini. Of her seven offspring four are still alive which include, Sandi, Sheldon, Sinbad and Schweini. Her son Sheldon became the alpha male of the Kasekela community in 2004.  Steve (born 1989) and Spud (born 1996) both died in infancy.

Sandi
Sandi (b. October 1973) is Sparrow's oldest daughter and first offspring. Sandi is one of the shyer females of the Gombe chimpanzees. She grew up within the community but her mother was not social and as a result, she still has a timid nature. Sandi is still close to her mother, Sparrow, and the two prefer each other's company rather than anyone else's. Sandi was very nervous of large groups of chimpanzees within the community and often prevented her offspring from playing with the others. However, she has become much more confident and her offspring have thrived.

Sandi has five offspring which include two daughters, Sherehe and Samwise and two sons, Sampson and Siri who are both sired by Apollo.

Barbet
Barbet (ca. 1978 – 1992) was Sparrow's second-oldest daughter. She died in 1992.

Sheldon
Sheldon (b. May 1983) is Sparrow's oldest son. Sheldon grew up within the community as a subordinate male but within 2004 following the vacancy of the alpha position after former alpha Frodo's departure, when he became the alpha male. Sheldon held on to dominance for only a year and lost the alpha position to another male, Kris, in 2005.  He was part of a coalition that helped his son Fudge attain the alpha male position in 2016.  He fathered Fanni's first three offspring, Fudge, Fundi and Familia.  He was a low ranking male when he fathered Fudge and Fundi, but had become the alpha male by the time he fathered Familia.  He also fathered Tita's son Tofiki in 2000 while a mid-ranking male.

Schweini
Schweini (b. April 1991) is Sparrow's third oldest daughter.  Her father is Wilkie. She gave birth to her first infant in September 2007 but she died in infancy. She gave birth to the female Safi on October 16, 2008, but she died in August 2011.  She also gave birth to a son Schall in November 2012.  She was brutally attacked by females of the Mitumba chimpanzee community while associating with males of that community in both 2004 and 2005.

Sinbad
Sinbad (b. June 2001) is Sparrow's youngest son.  His father was Frodo.

Sherehe
Sherehe (January 1991 – May 11, 2006) was Sandi's oldest daughter and first offspring.  Her father was Beethoven.  She gave birth to her first infant, Shangaa in 2004.

Sampson
Sampson (b. April 1996) is Sandi's oldest son.  His father is Apollo.  He is a low-ranking male.  Sampson was part of a coalition that included his uncle Sheldon and his cousin Fundi that helped Sampson's cousin Fudge supplant Ferdinand as alpha male in 2016.

Samwise
Samwise (b. June 2001) is Sandi's second-oldest daughter.  Her father was Frodo.

Alpha males
The alpha male is the highest-ranking male, most dominant chimpanzee, and can control most situations, including situations in which he is opposed by a coalition of other males.  Nonetheless, an alpha male typically cannot monopolize breeding opportunities, and in some cases lower-ranking males have been more successful at mating than alpha males, since the alpha male has to spend much energy maintaining his rank.  Faben (Figan's older brother with a paralyzed arm), Evered (defeated by Figan in his bid for alpha status who became Ferdinand's father) and Sherry (lower-ranking male who became Frodo's father) are examples of males who successfully devoted their energy to breeding success despite not attaining alpha status.  However, a very secure alpha male, such as Frodo, can use his status to increase his access to females in estrus, especially during the period when she is at peak fertility.

Goliath was the first chimpanzee Goodall recognized as the alpha male.  In 1964, Mike, who was previously a low-ranking male, deposed him.  Goliath remained a high-ranking male for several more years, but fell in rank as he aged.  Eventually, Goliath was one of the chimpanzees who left the Kasekela community to form the Kahama community.  However, in 1975 he was brutally attacked by a group of Kasekela males led by Faben, and died as a result of his injuries.

Mike figured out that incorporating cans and other objects left by the human researchers into his displays would make them more effective. These displays indeed allowed him to take over the alpha male rank in 1964.  By 1969, a group of younger males including Humphrey, Faben, Figan and Evered challenged and defeated him, making Humphrey the alpha male and returning Mike to his low-ranking position.

From 1972 through 1989, two males, Figan and Goblin, held the alpha position. Figan was able to defeat Humphrey when Faben became his ally. For a period after Faben's death in 1975, Figan remained the top-ranking male, but was unable to control coalitions of other males when they joined together, making his status as alpha male ambiguous. Within a few months, Figan reestablished himself as the unambiguous alpha by forging alliances with other high-ranking males, such as Humphrey. In 1979, 15-year-old Goblin, who had previously been protected by Figan challenged him for the alpha position. Goblin temporarily held the top-ranking position in 1979, although could not control coalitions of other males, before the more senior males brutally beat him and restored Figan to the alpha position. By 1982 Goblin had reestablished himself as the top-ranking male, and by 1984 was unambiguously the alpha male, able to control situations even against coalitions of other males.

In 1989 Wilkie defeated Goblin and attained the alpha position. According to researchers at the University of Minnesota's Jane Goodall Institute Center for Primate Studies, Wilkie attained his position primarily by becoming popular by obsessively grooming other males. Unlike most males, Wilkie also groomed females. Wilkie also made effective use of charging displays. Wilkie was overthrown in 1992 by his childhood playmate Freud, who was in turn deposed by his brother Frodo in 1997 while Freud was ill. After Frodo became ill in 2002, he was brutally beaten by a coalition of males led by Sheldon and spent two years travelling away from the rest of the community. No chimpanzee was able to establish himself as an alpha male until 2004. Sheldon briefly held the top-ranking male position in 2004, but by 2005 Kris had defeated all competitors, including Frodo, and established himself as the unambiguous alpha male. In 2008, Kris was supplanted as alpha male by Ferdinand, the youngest surviving brother of Freud and Frodo. Unlike most deposed alpha males, who tend to stay away from the group for a while in order to avoid further injury while the new alpha is consolidating his position, Kris stayed with the group after being deposed and eventually died of his injuries.

In October 2016 Ferdinand was attacked by a coalition of males led by his nephews Fudge and Fundi and also included the former alpha male Sheldon.  Ferdinand was badly injured in the attack and Fudge asserted himself as the new alpha male.

Alpha females

Female chimpanzees may not assert dominance as intensely as males, but females also have a hierarchy.
The highest-ranking female in the community, or alpha female, gets preferred access to food and resources. Females, unlike males, can inherit their status from their mothers or rise up the pecking order by moving between communities. The pecking order can change but is usually stable.

As a high-ranking female in the Kasekela community, Flo had access to food and good sleeping sites. Her eldest daughter Fifi inherited Flo's high status; Fifi later became the alpha female in the community. Fifi's daughter Fanni also became a high-ranking female.  Melissa was a high-ranking female, but lower in rank than Flo (and later, lower than Fifi). When Melissa died, her daughter Gremlin fell to the bottom of the pecking order.

Other communities of chimpanzees at Gombe Stream National Park
Within the Gombe Stream National Park live other chimpanzee communities other than the Kasekela, which also inhabit certain home ranges. The two other communities currently bordering the Kasekela community include:

 Mitumba Chimpanzee Community
 Kalande Chimpanzee Community

One extinct community of Gombe was:
 Kahama Chimpanzee Community

The Kahama community came about from a split within the Kasekela community.  In the early 1970s several of the Kasekela chimpanzees, including 8 adult males, kept to the northern portion of the Kasekela range, while others, including 7 adult males, kept to the southern portion of the range.  The two groups became hostile towards each other, and had less and less to do with each other, and eventually the southern community became totally separate, and was referred to by researchers as the Kahama community.  By 1974, the Kasekela males began to attack the Kahama chimpanzees in what was referred to as the "Four Year War."  Figan, Faben, Humphrey, Frodo's father Sherry, and Sherry's brother Jomeo were often among the ringleaders of the attacks.  Researchers described these attacks as being of the nature of raids, as opposed to simply defending their territory.  The Kasekela chimpanzees did not collect food during these "raids," although at least three Kahama females were brought back to the Kasekela community.  Kahama chimpanzees were brutally attacked during these raids and often were killed.  Former Kasekela alpha male Goliath, who had joined Kahama and was then very old, was killed in one such attack in 1975.  Kahama's alpha male Charley was killed in 1977.  By 1977 the Kahama community had been completely wiped out, and the Kasekela community absorbed its territory.

Annexing the Kahama territory brought the Kasekela community in contact with the Kalande Chimpanzee Community.  The Kalande community may have been attacking Kahama chimpanzees during the Four Year War, and after Kahama was wiped out they began to attack Kasekela chimpanzees.  At least one Kasekela female was badly injured in an attack by Kalande chimpanzees, and at least two infants were killed in such attacks.  Former Kasekela alpha male Humphrey died in 1981, possibly from injuries from an attack by Kalande chimpanzees.

Kasekela has had interactions with the Mitumba Chimpanzee Community as well.  Some of these interactions have been hostile, and some Mitumba chimpanzees are known to have been killed by Kasekela chimpanzees. At least two Kasekela females, Fifi's daughters Flossi and Flirt, have emigrated from Kasekela to join the Mitumba community.  Based on circumstantial evidence researchers believed that it is possible that Fifi herself may have died as a result of an attack by Mitumba chimpanzees.

Books about the community

Films about the community

Further reading

See also
Gombe Chimpanzee War
List of individual apes

References

Chimpanzees
Primatology
Jane Goodall
Lists of primates
Individual wild animals